William Thomas Passmore (September 6, 1882 – May 9, 1955) was an American lacrosse player who competed in the 1904 Summer Olympics. He was born and died in St. Louis, Missouri. In 1904, he was member of the St. Louis Amateur Athletic Association which won the silver medal in the lacrosse tournament. His younger brother, George, was also in the team.

References

External links
 
 

1882 births
1955 deaths
American lacrosse players
Olympic silver medalists for the United States in lacrosse
Lacrosse players at the 1904 Summer Olympics
Medalists at the 1904 Summer Olympics